was a Japanese actor. He is best known for playing monsters in several Toho science fiction and horror films directed by Ishirō Honda.

Career 
Tezuka was born in Tokyo, Japan. His first credited role in a motion picture was in the 1940 film Haruyo Izuko. He played a number of monster roles as an assistant to Haruo Nakajima.

Filmography

Film

References

Sources

External links 

 

Year of birth missing
Year of death missing
Japanese male film actors